is an inhabited island in the Geiyo Islands in the Seto Inland Sea of Japan, lying between the larger islands of Honshū and Shikoku.

Overview
Administratively, it was formerly divided between the towns of Yoshiumi and Miyakubo of Ochi District, Ehime; however, in January 16, 2005 both towns were absorbed into the city of Imabari. Compared to other islands in the Geiyo Archipelago, the island with many flat areas, which has permitted the developed of rice paddy fields. Other economic activities have traditionally included the cultivation of citrus fruits, mainly mikan, a small shipyard and stone quarries. The island is on the  Shimanami Kaidō, an expressway  between Honshū and Shikoku, and is linked to Hatakajima by the  Hakata-Ōshima Bridge and Kurushima by the Kurushima-Kaikyō Bridge. The expressway has placed the island within commuting distance of Imabari.

Islands of Ehime Prefecture
Islands of the Seto Inland Sea
Geiyo Islands
Imabari, Ehime